Acleris aenigmana is a species of moth of the family Tortricidae. It is found in North America, where it has been recorded from California and Utah.

Adults have been recorded on wing in April, June and October.

The larvae feed on Hypericum perforatum and Prunus emarginata.

References

Moths described in 1964
aenigmana
Moths of North America